The Telegraph Act 1870 (33 & 34 Vict. c. 88.) was an Act of the Parliament of the United Kingdom of Great Britain and Ireland. It extended the Telegraph Act 1868 to cover the Channel Islands and the Isle of Man, thus allowing the British state to nationalise telegraph companies in these territories. It gave orders to the Postmaster General to nationalize the Jersey and Guernsey Telegraph Company and the Isle of Man Electric Telegraph Company (the sale of which to the government had already been agreed in October 1868). The Act further makes clear that the Submarine Telegraph Company, which had laid a commercial submarine telegraph cable across the English Channel in 1853, was not to be affected. The Act was introduced partly due to the efforts of William Henry Preece, who was chief engineer of the Jersey and Guernsey Telegraph Company and a major shareholder, and had campaigned on behalf of the Channel Islands' inclusion in the Act of 1868.

The Isle of Man Telegraph Company was nationalised under the Act at a cost to the Post Office of £16,106. The shareholders received in total £11,774, which was approximately 160 times the worth of their holdings. The Jersey and Guernsey Telegraph Company was also purchased by the Government.

The Act was modified in 1923 in order to clarify the fact that the legislation does not apply to the Irish Free State or any of its successors. Its provisions have been made essentially redundant by the Telecommunications Act 1984, which allowed the Channel Islands' telecommunication companies to be privatized, leading to the creation of Jersey Telecom, Manx Telecom and Sure.

References

External links 
 Original text of the Act on the UK Office of Public Sector Information website - .
 Amended text of the Act on the UK Statute Law Database - 

Communications in the Isle of Man
Communications in the United Kingdom
United Kingdom Acts of Parliament 1870
Acts of the Parliament of the United Kingdom concerning Guernsey
Acts of the Parliament of the United Kingdom concerning Jersey
Acts of the Parliament of the United Kingdom concerning the Isle of Man